The 2019–20 Colorado Avalanche season was the 25th operational season and 24th playing season since the franchise relocated from Quebec prior to the start of the 1995–96 NHL season. As well as the franchise's 41st season in the National Hockey League and 48th season overall. The Avalanche will commemorate their 25th anniversary in the 2020-21 season.

The season was suspended by the league officials on March 12, 2020, after several other professional and collegiate sports organizations followed suit as a result of the ongoing COVID-19 pandemic. Two of the Avalanche's players tested positive for COVID-19. On May 26, the NHL regular season was officially declared over with the remaining games being cancelled.

The Avalanche advanced to the playoffs for the third straight season, after last missing the playoffs in the 2016–17 season. In the Playoffs, the Avalanche defeated the Arizona Coyotes in five games in the first round, before losing to the Dallas Stars in seven games in the second round. The season marked a turning point in the Avalanche's history, as it started a period of extreme strength for the franchise.

Standings

Divisional standings

Western Conference

Tiebreaking procedures
 Fewer number of games played (only used during regular season).
 Greater number of regulation wins (denoted by RW).
 Greater number of wins in regulation and overtime (excluding shootout wins; denoted by ROW).
 Greater number of total wins (including shootouts).
 Greater number of points earned in head-to-head play; if teams played an uneven number of head-to-head games, the result of the first game on the home ice of the team with the extra home game is discarded.
 Greater goal differential (difference between goals for and goals against).
 Greater number of goals scored (denoted by GF).

Schedule and results

Preseason
The preseason schedule was published on June 13, 2019.

Regular season
The regular season schedule was published on June 25, 2019.

Playoffs 

The Avalanche played in a round-robin tournament to determine their seed for the playoffs. Colorado finished with a 2–0–1 record to clinch the second seed for the playoffs.

The Avalanche faced the Arizona Coyotes in the first round and defeated them in five games.

The Avalanche faced the Dallas Stars in the second round, but lost in seven games.

Player statistics
Final stats
Skaters

Goaltenders

†Denotes player spent time with another team before joining the Avalanche. Stats reflect time with the Avalanche only.
‡Denotes player was traded mid-season. Stats reflect time with the Avalanche only.
Bold/italics denotes franchise record.

Transactions
The Avalanche have been involved in the following transactions during the 2019–20 season.

Trades

Free agents

Waivers

Contract terminations

Retirement

Signings

Draft picks

Below are the Colorado Avalanches' selections at the 2019 NHL Entry Draft, which was held on June 21 and 22, 2019, at the Rogers Arena in Vancouver, British Columbia.

References

Colorado Avalanche seasons
Colorado Avalanche
Colorado Avalanche
Colorado Avalanche